Acrobasis birgitella is a species of snout moth in the genus Acrobasis. It was described by Roesler in 1975. It is found in China and Taiwan.

References

Moths described in 1975
Acrobasis
Moths of Asia